Chaudhary Babulal (born 2 July 1948) is an Indian politician from the state of Uttar Pradesh. He served as the Member of Parliament (MP) for the Fatehpur Sikri (Uttar Pradesh) constituency of 16th Lok Sabha. As a member of Bhartiya Janta Party(BJP), he's one of the most prominent Jat leaders of western Uttar Pradesh for more than three decades.

Personal life
Chaudhary was born on 2 July 1948 in the village of Panwari, near the city Agra, in a farming family of Raghunath Singh and Kiran Devi.

He was educated at Raja Balwant Singh College, Agra to Intermediate level.

Chaudhary married Mahaviri Devi and they have five sons and one daughter. Their eldest, Rameshwar Chaudhary, has unsuccessfully contested twice in the Lok Sabha general elections; for Agra in 1998 and then Mathura in 1999. He placed second in both elections with 1.90 lakh and 2 lakh votes respectively. He now runs a chain of degree colleges.

Political career
Since his childhood, he was influenced by Choudhary Charan Singh, the 5th Prime Minister of India and famous Jat leader from western Uttar Pradesh. Despite his young age, he successfully contested the elections of "Block Pramukh" and "Zila Panchayat Sadasya" under the umbrella of "Panchayat General Election" of Uttar Pradesh Government. He was elected twice to the Uttar Pradesh Legislative Assembly (13th Legislative Assembly, 1996–2002 and then 14th Legislative Assembly, 2002–2007) as Member of the Legislative Assembly for the Fatehpur Sikri constituency. He has served as a Cabinet Minister in the Government of Kumari Mayawati (2002–03) and then in the Government of Mulayam Singh Yadav (2003–2007). He has been the Minister for various government departments including the Ministry of Food Processing, Pension, "Rashtriya Bhasha" and "Maddah Nishedh". He is currently the member of the Committee on Defence and Committee on Food, Consumer Affairs and Public Distribution.

References

Living people
1948 births
India MPs 2014–2019
Indian Hindus
Lok Sabha members from Uttar Pradesh
Bharatiya Janata Party politicians from Uttar Pradesh
People from Agra district
Uttar Pradesh MLAs 2022–2027